Hatchet III is a 2013 American slasher film written by Adam Green and directed by B. J. McDonnell. It is the sequel to Adam Green's Hatchet and Hatchet II, and the third installment in the Hatchet film series. Kane Hodder portrays the main antagonist Victor Crowley for the third time in a row, while Danielle Harris returns to play protagonist Marybeth Dunston.

Plot
After apparently managing to kill Victor Crowley, Marybeth Dunston makes her way back into the city, bloodied and disorientated. She walks into the Jefferson Parish Police Department, where she is quickly put into custody due to her carrying Victor's scalp. Upon the discovery of the carnage at Honey Island Swamp, she is placed as the prime suspect for the murders by Sheriff Fowler, despite her swearing her innocence. Folwer heads out to the swamp with the paramedics and fire department, leaving Deputy Winslow in charge of the station until he gets back.

Amanda, Fowler's ex-wife, journalist and an expert about the legend of Victor Crowley, comes into the station to interview Marybeth. After retelling the events of the previous two films to Amanda, Amanda tells her that Victor has been cursed to relive the same night over and over again, and that he will keep coming back unless he gets what he wants — his father, Thomas Crowley. She tells Marybeth that she is the only one can put an end to Victor, since her bloodline connects her to her father Sampson, who was involved in starting the housefire that killed Victor as a child.

At Honey Island Swamp, the body of Victor is bagged and put into a water ambulance. Suddenly, Victor reanimates and massacres most of the first response team, save for Fowler and a pair of paramedics, which include Andrew. Back at the station, upon hearing the carnage over the radio, Amanda convinces Deputy Winslow to let Marybeth out of jail and help her save those at the swamp.

Meanwhile back at the swamp, a SWAT team led by Tyler takes over the operation from Fowler and is lead to the Crowley house alongside a handful of deputies. Victor, however, is quickly able to kill nearly the entire squad, save for SWAT Officer Dougherty, Andrew and Fowler, who manage to escape amidst the chaos. Meanwhile, Amanda, Winslow and Marybeth manage to obtain Thomas Crowley's ashes from Abbott MacMullen, Victor Crowley's racist long distant cousin.

Andrew, Fowler and Dougherty manage to outrun Victor and barricade themselves inside the water ambulance. Shortly after, however, Victor begins to saw his way through the boat wall with a belt sander. Meanwhile, Amanda, Winslow and Marybeth arrive at the Swamp outside the burned down Crowley house. Amanda calls out for Victor, telling him they have his father. Upon hearing Amanda's voice, Fowler expresses relief, only to be grabbed by Victor and killed with the belt sander. Victor also grabs Dougherty and pulls her through the hole on the door, which disembowels her, but Andrew manages to stay hidden from Victor and survive.

Victor goes back to his destroyed home and finds Amanda and Deputy Winslow there but refrains from attacking when he sees the ashes. Marybeth offers Victor his father's ashes and apologizes for what her father did to him. When Victor approaches to take the ashes, however, Deputy Winslow mistakes it for Victor going to attack Marybeth and shoots him down, but Victor rises back up, and kills Winslow and Amanda out of rage. Victor then grabs Marybeth and impales her on a tree branch, severely wounding her. Before he can finish her off, however, Marybeth smashes the urn over Victor's head, covering him in his father's ashes and causing his body to begin melting. With her last bit of strength, she grabs one of the SWAT team's guns and blows his remains away before collapsing. The National Guard then arrives and Andrew, now free of danger, emerges from the boat and signals the helicopters. Just as the screen cuts to black, one final shot of Marybeth gasping for air is shown, leaving her fate unknown.

Cast

Production

Hatchet II director Adam Green originally stated that two more sequels would follow. In 2011, Dark Sky gave the green light for Hatchet III. Green declined to helm the sequel himself, but still wrote, produced, presented, and retained creative control having final cut over the film while hand-picking the director. Hatchet and Hatchet II cameraman BJ McDonnell took over for Green on the third film.

Release

Theatrical
Hatchet III was first shown at Adam Green's fundraiser dedicated to the victims of the 2013 Boston bombings and the film was released in theaters and Video On Demand on June 14, 2013.

Home media
A home media release followed later in 2013.

Reception

Critical response

Hatchet III received mixed reviews from critics. Based on 23 reviews collected by Rotten Tomatoes, Hatchet III has a 57% approval rating with an average score of 4.9 out of 10. The site's consensus reads: "Way to bury the lede -- or rather Hatchet III, as this hacked and staggering sequel crawls it's way to the bloody end". Metacritic gave the film an average score of 25 out of 100, based on 8 reviews.

Sequel

In August 2017, it was announced that a fourth Hatchet film had been secretly filmed and completed and would be released in October as Victor Crowley. Directed by Adam Green, the film takes place ten years after the events of the first three films with Kane Hodder reprising his role as Victor Crowley and Parry Shen reprising his role as Hatchet III survivor Andrew Yong. The film will be shown in select U.S. theaters as part of Dark Sky Films' "Victor Crowley Road Show" event in celebration of the first film's ten-year anniversary as well as international film festivals. A teaser trailer was released the day after the film was announced.

References

External links
 
 
 

2010s serial killer films
2010s slasher films
2013 films
2013 horror films
2013 independent films
American exploitation films
American films about revenge
American independent films
American sequel films
American slasher films
American splatter films
American supernatural horror films
Films set in Louisiana
Films shot in New Orleans
Hatchet (film series)
2013 directorial debut films
2010s English-language films
2010s American films